In generative linguistics, PRO (called "big PRO", distinct from pro, "small pro" or "little pro") is a pronominal determiner phrase (DP) without phonological content. As such, it is part of the set of empty categories. The null pronoun PRO is postulated in the subject position of non-finite clauses. One property of PRO is that, when it occurs in a non-finite complement clause, it can be bound by the main clause subject ("subject control") or the main clause object ("object control"). The presence of PRO in non-finite clauses lacking overt subjects allows a principled solution for problems relating to binding theory.

Within government and binding theory, the existence and distribution of PRO followed from the PRO theorem, which states that PRO may not be governed. More recent analyses have abandoned the PRO theorem. Instead, PRO is taken to be in complementary distribution with overt subjects because it is the only item that is able to carry null case which is checked for by non-finite tense markers (T), for example the English to in control infinitives.

Motivation for PRO
There are several independent pieces of linguistic theory which motivate the existence of PRO. The following four are reviewed here:
 the extended projection principle
 the theta criterion
 binding theory
 nominal agreement

Extended projection principle
The extended projection principle (EPP) requires that all clauses have a subject. A consequence of the EPP is that clauses that lack an overt subject must necessarily have an "invisible" or "covert" subject; with non-finite clauses this covert subject is PRO.

Motivation for a PRO subject comes from the grammaticality of sentences such as (1) and (2), where the subject of the infinitival to-clause, though not overtly expressed, is understood to be controlled by an argument of the main clause. In (1a), the subject of control is understood to be the same person that issued the promise, namely John. This is annotated in (1b) by co-indexing John with PRO, which indicates that the PRO subject of [TP to control the situation] co-refers with John. In (2a), the subject of sleep is understood to be the same person that was convinced, namely Bill. This is annotated in(2b) by co-indexing Bill with PRO, which indicates that the PRO subject of [TP to sleep] co-refers with Bill.

Since the argument that controls PRO in (1a) is the subject, this is called subject control, and PRO is co-indexed with its antecedent John, As shown in (2a), it is also possible to have object control, where the argument that controls PRO is the object of the main clause, and PRO is co-indexed with its antecedent Bill.

In the context of the EPP, the existence of subject and object control follows naturally from the fact that the null pronominal subject PRO can be co-indexed with different DP arguments. While (1a) and (2a) show the surface sentences, (1b) and (2b) show the more abstract structure where PRO serves as the subject of the non-finite clauses, thereby satisfying the EPP-feature of T (realized by infinitival 'to'). The following tree diagrams of examples (1) and (2) show how PRO occupies the subject position of non-finite clauses.

Theta criterion
Every verb has theta roles and under the theta criterion every theta role must be present in the structure of the sentence; this means that theta roles must be associated with a syntactic position even when there is no overt argument. Therefore, in the absence of an overt subject, the null category PRO helps to satisfy the theta criterion. For example:

In example (3), the verb examine is associated with the following lexical entry:

 examine: V <DPagent DPtheme>

Accordingly, the verb examine must have a DP (determiner phrase) as an agent and a DP as a theme. However, in (3a), since no overt DP functions as the agent of examine, this should be a violation of the theta criterion. However, the presence of the null PRO subject, as shown (3b), satisfies the theta criterion by having PRO as the DPagent in the sentence and the patient as the DPtheme. The tree diagram (3) represents how PRO satisfies the theta criterion of examine by being the DPagent in the non-finite clause.

Binding theory

The claim that non-finite clauses have a phonologically null PRO subject is in part motivated by binding theory — in particular, the idea that an anaphor requires a local antecedent to be present. Reflexive pronouns such as myself and oneself require a local antecedent. As shown in (4), PRO can function as an antecedent for reflexives: in (4a) PRO is the antecedent for the reflexive pronoun 'myself', and in (4b) PRO functions as the antecedent for the impersonal reflexive oneself. If the null subject PRO were not present in examples like (4a) and (4b), then non-finite clauses would contain anaphors that lacked a local antecedent, and incorrectly predicting that such sentences to be ungrammatical. The grammaticality of such sentences confirms that the reflexives have an antecedent, which by hypothesis is PRO.

Note, however, that PRO itself has no local antecedent in these examples: PRO can share reference with an external referent as in (4a), or have an arbitrary reading as in (4b).

Nominal agreement
Evidence that non-finite clauses have a phonologically null PRO subject comes from the fact that predicate nominals must agree with the subject of a copular clause. This is illustrated in (5) and (6). Example (5) shows that the number of the predicate nominal must agree with that of the overt subject: in (5a) the singular subject (their son) requires a singular nominal predicate (millionaire); in (5b), the plural subject (his sons) requires a plural nominal predicate (millionaires). The examples in (6) show that the same contrast holds of PRO subjects: if PRO is controlled by a singular antecedent, in (6a) the subject of want, then the predicate nominal must be singular; if PRO is controlled by a plural antecedent, as in (6b), then the predicate nominal must be plural.

The following tree diagrams show how PRO, as the subject of the copular clause, enters into agreement with the nominal predicate introduced by the copular verb become. The application of agreement is automatically explained if PRO is co-indexed with the subject of the main clause, with the predicate nominal simply agreeing with the number features of the argument that controls PRO, just as it would be if an overt subject had been introduced.

Theoretical status of PRO
There are two main approaches to PRO:
 work from the 1980s attempts to derive its existence from the PRO theorem
 recent work emphasizes the connection of PRO with weak case

PRO theorem
The interpretation of PRO may be dependent on another noun phrase; in this respect PRO behaves like an anaphor. But it is also possible for PRO to have arbitrary reference; in this respect, PRO behaves like a pronominal. This is why, in terms of features, PRO may be described as follows:

 PRO = [+anaphor, +pronominal]

However, this set of features poses a problem for binding theory, as it imposes contradictory constraints on the distribution of PRO. This is because an anaphor must be bound in its governing category, but a pronominal must be free in its governing category:

  an anaphor must be bound in governing category
  a pronominal must be free in governing category

Chomsky (1981) solves this paradox with the so-called PRO theorem which states that PRO must be ungoverned.

Since PRO cannot be governed it cannot have a governing category, and so is exempt from the binding theory.  Under this definition, the features of PRO no longer conflict with the principles of binding theory. However, developments in binding theory since 1981 have presented significant challenges to the PRO theorem.  For example, if PRO is ungoverned, then it must not be case-marked. However, in Icelandic, PRO appears to be case-marked, and is thus governed. More recent research attempts to characterize PRO without reference to the PRO theorem.

Null case of PRO

It has been argued that PRO has case, which is checked by non-finite T. This is illustrated by the contrasting examples in (7), (8) and (9) below. The (a) examples show contexts where an overt DP subject is ungrammatical in the specifier position of the TP (tense phrase). The (b) examples shows that, in exactly the same contexts, a null PRO subject is grammatical.

The subject of the non-finite T must satisfy the case checked by T, and this case cannot be satisfied by a pronounced (i.e., overt) DP, it is argued that these non-finite T's (and -ing clausal gerunds), check for a special null case (assigned in English by infinitival to), and that the only DP compatible with such a case is PRO.

The following tree diagrams for (7b), (8b), and (9b) show how PRO can be co-indexed with the different types of antecedents: the tree diagram for (7a) shows subject control; the tree for (8b) shows object control; the tree for (9b) shows PRO with arbitrary reference.

It is furthermore argued that null case is the only case assignable to PRO, and that PRO is the only DP to which null case may be assigned. These assertions have since been challenged by certain data which appear to demonstrate that PRO may carry case other than null case.

Distribution of PRO
The distribution of PRO is constrained by the following factors:
 PRO can only be the subject of a non-finite clause
 PRO can be controlled by a subject or object antecedent
 PRO can lack an antecedent, i.e. be uncontrolled
 PRO may undergo movement

PRO as subject of non-finite clause
The examples in (10) show that PRO is grammatical as the subject of non-finite clauses. In both (10a) and (10b), PRO is the subject of the non-finite clause to study physics. In (10a), the antecedent of PRO is the matrix subject Kerry, and in (10b) it is the matrix object Sarah. The examples in (11) show that PRO is ungrammatical in finite clauses and in non-subject position: (11a) establishes that PRO cannot be the subject of a finite clause, and (11b-c) establish that PRO cannot occur in complement position. In particular, (11b) shows that PRO cannot be complement to V, while (11c) shows that PRO cannot be complement to P.

Obligatory control of PRO
In contexts where PRO is obligatorily controlled, the following restrictions hold:
 PRO must have an antecedent (12a);
 the antecedent for PRO must be local (12b);
 PRO must be c-commanded by the antecedent (12c);
 under VP ellipsis, PRO can only be construed with a sloppy (bound variable) reading: in (12d) Bill expects himself (Bill) to win (the reading where Bill expects John to win is excluded);
 obligatorily controlled PRO may not have split antecedents,(12e).

Non-obligatory control of PRO
In contexts where PRO is not obligatorily controlled, as in (13a), then when PRO does have an antecedent, the following restrictions hold:
 the antecedent need not be local, (13b);
 the antecedent need not c-command PRO,(13c);
 with VP-ellipsis, both sloppy and strict readings are permitted: in (13d), Bill may think that John having his resume in order is crucial, or that Bill may that having his own resume in order is crucial (Need fixation, Ala Al-Kajela 2015 PRO Theory, Norbert Hornstein 1999 Movement and Control claims NOC only allows strict interpretation with VP ellipsis.)
 under non-obligatory control, PRO allows split antecedents, (13e)

Movement of PRO

For a sentence such as (14a), there is a debate about whether PRO moves from Spec-VP (where it is introduced) to Spec-TP in non-finite clauses. Baltin (1995) argues that the tense marker to does not have an EPP feature, and that therefore PRO does not move to Spec-TP; this yields the structure in (14b). In contrast, Radford (2004) argues that infinitival to does have an EPP feature, and that therefore PRO must move to Spec-TP, as in (14c).

Baltin argues against moving PRO to Spec-TP on this basis of so-called wanna contraction, illustrated in (15): placing PRO between want and to would block the contraction of want+to into wanna. Radford argues that an analysis that assigns an EPP feature to infinitival to (and so forces movement of PRO to Spec-TP), can still account for wanna:  the latter can be achieved by having to cliticise onto the null complementizer ∅, and then having this [C-T] compound cliticise onto want.

Radford justifies moving PRO to Spec-TP on the basis of the binding properties of certain sentences. For example, in (16), moving PRO to Spec-TP is necessary for it to c-command themselves, which in turn is necessary to satisfy the binding principles and have PRO be coreferenced with themselves.

Cross-linguistic differences in PRO
Occurrences of PRO have been discussed and documented with regards to many languages. Major points of similarities and differences center on the following:
 whether PRO lacks case (e.g., English)
 whether PRO has case (e.g., Icelandic)
 whether experiencer arguments can control PRO in adjunct clauses (e.g., Romance languages)

English PRO is caseless

In English, PRO is treated as caseless, and can be controlled by the subject (17a) or object (17b) of the verb in the main clause) or it may be uncontrolled (17c).

In (17a) above, the subject of the verb in the main clause (John promised Mary) is John, so PRO is interpreted as referring to John, while in (17b) to sleep is an action performed by Bill, and PRO is interpreted as referring to Bill. And in (17c), PRO is not controlled by any antecedent, and so can be paraphrased as 'For someone to love her is for someone to know her'; this is called impersonal PRO or arbitrary PRO.

Icelandic PRO is case-marked
Icelandic PRO appears to be case-marked. Rules of case agreement in Icelandic require that floated quantifiers agree in case (as well as in number and gender) with the DP they quantify. As illustrated in (18) and (19), this agreement requirement holds of PRO. In (18), the quantifier báðir 'both' appears in the nominative masculine plural form. In (19), the quantifier báðum 'both' appears in the dative plural form. The occurrence of such forms indicates that the quantifiers are agreeing with their antecedent, namely PRO. This leads to the conclusion that PRO must be case-marked, and this is possible only if PRO is in Spec-TP.

Romance PRO controlled by Dative experiencer
PRO in adjunct clauses in Spanish can be controlled by dative experiencer subjects. In (20), the verb saber 'know' introduces the dative experiencer subject Juan, and this DP controls the PRO in the phrase sin PRO saber por qué. (Dative experiencers (see Theta role) were also very common in Old English.)

In French, PRO can be controlled by dative experiencers in object position in an adjunct clause. (This is also true for Spanish.) In (21), the dative experiencer object Pierre controls the PRO-subject of the adjunct clause avant même de PRO y avoir été initié 'before even having been initiated to it'.

The structure of sentences like (21) can lead to an ambiguous interpretation if the subject is animate. This illustrated in (26), where the PRO in the adjunct clause can be controlled by either the subject (22a) or the object (22b) of the main clause.

Alternative theories

A movement theory of control
Norbert Hornstein has proposed that control verbs can be explained without resorting to PRO, and as such that PRO can be done away with entirely. This theory explains obligatory control with movement, and non-obligatory control with pro (little pro). This alternative theory of control is in part motivated by adherence to the minimalist program.

Working assumptions

The movement theory of control is predicated on the following principles.

The idea introduced in (23d) is of particular importance as a single DP/NP-chain can acquire more than one θ-role by simultaneously satisfying the θ-criterion across multiple positions, e.g. the subject of the non-finite embedded clause and the subject of the matrix verb. In this context a chain refers to an argument which has moved and all of its traces. Hornstein argues that there is insufficient empirical evidence that a chain must be restricted to a single θ-role and that allowing multiple θ-roles per chain is the null hypothesis.

Obligatory control as movement

These principles allow control verbs to be explained by movement and what had previously been analyzed as PRO is instead treated as the trace of DP/NP-movement. Consider the example in (24): to derive (24a) the DP John moves through several positions, and checks a θ-role at each landing site; this is shown in (24b). In this way, the chain of Johns satisfies the Agent θ-role of the verb hope, as well as the Agent θ-role of the verb leave. In the movement analysis, multiple θ-role assignment does the same work as allowing obligatory control of a PRO subject.

Non-obligatory control as pro
With the need for PRO eliminated under obligatory control, Hornstein argues that it follows naturally that PRO should be altogether eliminated from the theory as it is equivalent to little pro. In particular, little pro is equivalent to an indefinite or a definite pronoun (similar to English one) and has the same distribution as non-obligatory control PRO. With non-obligatory control, an overt embedded subject may be introduced (25) or omitted (26), and omitting the embedded subject may result in an arbitrary reading. Additionally, the overt subject may not be moved out of the embedded clause, (27).

In addition, non-obligatory control and movement are in complementary distribution. Since non-obligatory control occurs when movement is not permitted, it may be treated as an elsewhere case: little pro inserted as a last resort measure to rescue the derivation if an overt subject is missing.

Criticism

Since the publication of this movement theory of control some data has been discussed which it does not explain, challenging the completeness of the movement theory of control.
 Imoaka argues that scrambling out of a split control clause is incompatible with the movement theory of control as constructed in Japanese by Takano and Fujii. Imoaka argues for a theory of Equi-NP Deletion to explain control and claims that such a theory is empirically superior as it successfully explains the problematic data as well as the data previously explained by the movement theory of control.

Abbreviation keys

Morpheme gloss key

Syntactic abbreviation key

Tree diagram key

(See Syntactic abbreviation key for more information.)

Note: Both the tense marker (under Ts) and the tensed verb (under Vs) are added in the syntactic tree diagrams for readability, although only one would be shown in an average tree diagram. That is, the verbs in these trees would be in the infinitival form if the tense (T) is shown, and is not empty (Ø). Also, movement of determiner phrases has only been illustrated when it is relevant, as in Tree Diagram (10).

See also
 Control (linguistics)
 Pronoun
 Binding (linguistics)
 Empty category
 Non-finite clauses
 Determiner phrase

References

Generative syntax